Stanisławów  is a village in the administrative district of Gmina Męcinka, within Jawor County, Lower Silesian Voivodeship, in south-western Poland. The village has a population of 150.

Notable residents
 Bruno Bräuer (4 February 1893 – 20 May 1947), Wehrmacht general

References

Villages in Jawor County